Youssef Boulos (born 22 December 1994) is Lebanese stage and film actor. He received critical acclaim for his performance opposite Lebanese-French actress Stephanie Atala in the 2022 Lebanese film Farah. Boulos' good looks, and his resemblance to popular Turkish actor Berker Guven, made him a heartthrob among Lebanese women.

Early life and education 
Youssef was born in Chekka in North Lebanon on 22 December 1994 to Jean Boulos and Najat Semaan. Boulos showed interest in acting at a young age, performing sketches with his family and friends, and in school, where his talent was recognized and encouraged. The actor cites Youssef Chahine's 2004 French-Egyptian drama Alexandria... New York as the main film that influenced him to pursue an acting education and career. He would later work alongside one of his idols from that movie, Egyptian actress Nelly Karim, in a film directed by Tunisian filmmaker Majdi Smiri.  

Boulos moved between Kuwait, the United Arab Emirates and France. In France, he attended Paris 1 Panthéon-Sorbonne University, and graduated in Cinematography and Event Production, and Drama therapy. He completed further studies, and obtained a master’s degree in Film Production.

Career 
Boulos' first leading role was in Father Fady Tabet's play ʿAfwaki Ya Ummi (Sorry Mother). The company toured in various countries, including Jordan and Australia. In 2017, he played the lead role of aspiring actor Nadim in Serge Majdalani's Take my hand. Boulos appeared in the 2018 Lebanese series Habibi al-Ladoud (My sworn ennemy lover), and in the 2019 production Akher el-Layl (Night's end). In 2020, he appeared in the Syrian-Lebanese comedy series Mayyada wa Wlada (Mayyada and her children), along with Syrian star actress Shukran Murtaja.

In 2021, he played the role of a drug dealer in all seven episodes of the true crime Saudi thriller miniseries Rashash (Machine gun). The series, which is set in ultra-conservative 1990s Saudi Arabia, was described as a groundbreaking, and a benchmark for the local film industry.    

In 2022, Boulos starred in the Emirati-Lebanese psychological thriller Farah (Joy), where he plays The Reporter, an unnamed personage who appears to be the product of the protagonist's confabulations. Farah garnered favorable reviews and won the Special 10th Anniversary Award for Best Feature Film at the 2022 New York’s Chelsea Film Festival, Best Feature Film award at the Lebanese Independent Film Festival. At the Alexandria Mediterranean Film Festival, the movie won the Best Arabic Film award and the Mahmoud Abdel Aziz Best Art Direction prize. The film also won the Best Feature Film Award at the Lebanese Film Festival Canada. Critics also praised the performances of actors Boulos and Atala.

Views 
Boulos stated that he was heavily influenced by the careers of Youssef Chahine and Ewan McGregor. He is a mental health activist and a gender equality supporter; in a 2022 interview however, he voiced his concerns over the adverse and detrimental consequences of militant feminism on the support of women's rights in developing countries.

References

Citations

Sources 

 
 
 
 
 
 
 
 
 
 
 
 
 
 
 
 
 
 
 
 

1994 births
Lebanese film actors
Lebanese television actors
Lebanese theatre people
Living people